Graham Henderson is a Canadian lawyer (suspended administratively) and, since March 2021, the CEO of the London Chamber of Commerce in London, Ontario, Canada.

Prior to 2021, he was the president of Music Canada (formerly the Canadian Recording Industry Association), a lobby group for a number of major record labels in Canada.

Henderson also spent time working at Universal Music Canada, was a partner at the law firm of McCarthy Tetrault, and operated a boutique entertainment law firm.

He is married to Margo Timmins of Cowboy Junkies.

References

External links
 Canadian Recording Industry Association biography

Living people
Lawyers in Ontario
University of Guelph alumni
University of Toronto alumni
Year of birth missing (living people)
20th-century Canadian lawyers